The Bridge is a video game designed by American developer Ty Taylor for Microsoft Windows, Linux, OS X, Amazon Fire TV, Android, Xbox 360, Xbox One, Ouya, PlayStation 3, PlayStation 4, PlayStation Vita, Wii U, and Nintendo Switch. The player controls an Escher-like character and the rotation of the 2D environment, which affects gravity based on the changing orientation of the landscape.

Plot 
The game opens with the nameless main character sleeping under an apple tree. After an apple hits him in the head and wakes him up, he is guided to his house with three doors, behind which lie further doors and levels. The story is explained through the environment and post-world text as the game progresses.

Gameplay 
The goal of each level is to get the main character to the exit door. The game's puzzles are inspired by the art of M. C. Escher and like his artworks, each level unfolds in grayscale with hand-drawn illustrations. The player can rotate the world using the arrow keys, changing the gravitational direction of individual objects, or control the main character with A and D to go left and right.
The Wii U version utilizes the GamePad touch and accelerometer. The player can use the Wii U GamePad touch capabilities to interact with the world to move the character, open doors, activate objects, and interact with the menu system and UI. The player can also tilt the Wii U GamePad to rotate gravity in the game.

Reception 

The Bridge received positive reviews from critics. It has an aggregate score of 74/100 on Metacritic. The game won the 2012 Indie Game Challenge award for Achievement in Art Direction and Achievement in Gameplay.

References

External links 

2013 video games
Android (operating system) games
Indie video games
Monochrome video games
Nintendo Switch games
Ouya games
PlayStation 3 games
PlayStation 4 games
PlayStation Network games
PlayStation Vita games
Puzzle video games
Video games developed in the United States
Video games inspired by M. C. Escher
Wii U eShop games
Windows games
Xbox 360 Live Arcade games
Xbox One games
Linux games
MacOS games
Single-player video games